NGC 1380 is a lenticular galaxy located in the constellation Fornax. It is located at a distance of circa 60 million light years from Earth, which, given its apparent dimensions, means that NGC 1380 is about 85,000 light years across. It was discovered by James Dunlop on September 2, 1826. It is a member of the Fornax Cluster.

Supermassive black hole and nucleus 

In the centre of NGC 1380 lies a supermassive black hole whose mass is estimated to be  based on the velocity dispersion of the globular clusters of the galaxy. The nucleus of NGC 1380 is a probable LINER, based on its narrow emission lines. No broad line region has been detected in NGC 1380. The nuclear spectrum appears reddened, maybe due to the presence of gas and dust around the nucleus, maybe a result of mergers. There appears to be a second element in the nucleus of the galaxy, maybe an HII region. NGC 1380 features a gas disk which co-rotates with the stellar disk, suggesting an internal origin. There is an HII region 1.8 arcseconds south of the nucleus and a diffuse H-alpha region, another HII region, observed 1.8 arcseconds north of the nucleus. The X-ray emission from the galaxy as observed by ROSAT can be explained as thermal emission from a hot interstellar medium and no hard component was detected.

Globular clusters 

It is estimated that there are  globular clusters in NGC 1380. There are two district populations of globular clusters, one red and one blue. The blue globular clusters have similar color and magnitude as the globular clusters in the halo of the Milky Way, but have a flatter surface density profile. The red globular clusters form the majority of the globular clusters of the galaxy. They have similar distribution to the stellar disk of NGC 1380 and have slightly higher metallicity than the globular clusters in the Milky Way, and are associated with the bulge of the galaxy. Based on their size, there are three star cluster populations, the typical globular clusters, with effective radius under 3 kpc, the diffuse star clusters, with effective radius circa 5 kpc, and the faint fuzzy clusters, with effective radius over 8 kpc. The typical globular clusters are closer to the nucleus than the diffuse star clusters.

Environment 

NGC 1380 lies in the central part of the Fornax Cluster, 35 arcminutes northwest of the large elliptical galaxy NGC 1399. In the same field of view lie the galaxies NGC 1380A, NGC 1379, NGC 1381, NGC 1382, and NGC 1387. NGC 1380 lies 2 degrees north-northeast of Chi2 Fornacis and because of its high surface brightness can be spotted with a five inch telescope even from bright suburban skies. One supernova has been detected in NGC 1380, SN 1992A, a type Ia supernova with peak magnitude of 12.8.

Based on the properties of its inner stellar halo, it appears that NGC 1380 went through a massive galaxy merger event about 10 billion years ago. The now-consumed satellite galaxy contributed  to the mass of NGC 1380, which is about one-fifth of its current mass.

Gallery

References

External links 

NGC 1380 on SIMBAD

Lenticular galaxies
Fornax (constellation)
Fornax Cluster
1380
13318
Discoveries by James Dunlop
Astronomical objects discovered in 1826